Archdiocese of Tirana may refere to:

 Albanian Orthodox Archdiocese of Tirana-Durrës, the principal diocese of Albanian Orthodox Church
 Roman Catholic Archdiocese of Tirana-Durrës, a senior Catholic diocese in Albania

See also
 Archbishop of Tirana (disambiguation)